The 2017 European Women's U-17 Handball Championship was the 13th edition, which took place in Slovakia. Germany won the first title by defeating Norway in the final.

Qualified teams

Preliminary round

Group A

Group B

Group C

Group D

Knockout stage

Semifinals

Third place game

Final

Rankings and awardees

Final standings

References

External links 
 Official website
 Eurohandball.com 

2017 in women's handball
Youth